"The One Where Ross Can't Flirt" is the nineteenth episode of Friends fifth season. It first aired on NBC in the United States on April 22, 1999. In the episode, Monica and Chandler celebrate their ten-month anniversary as a couple by going out. Chandler wants Monica to wear the pair of earrings he bought her as a present, unaware she lent them to Phoebe whom in turn gave them to Rachel, who accidentally lost one. Meanwhile, Ross sees Chandler flirting with the pizza girl Caitlin, and decides to follow his example, with disastrous results. Joey lands a part in Law & Order; his grandmother comes over to New York to watch his part. However, when he discovers his part has been cut out, Joey improvises by recording a scene on a video tape and putting it into the VCR.

Plot
Chandler, dressed up for his and Monica's ten-month anniversary, picks up some pizzas that delivery girl Caitlin has brought for the group, but Ross mistakes his friend's natural jokes for flirting, which Chandler denies. Phoebe points out that the real reason Ross is mad is because he finds Caitlin attractive, and Ross takes the opportunity to flirt with her when he finds a missing vegetarian pizza for Phoebe. Ross makes inappropriate comments to Caitlin and saddened by his effort, he orders another pizza and practices flirting with Phoebe. Caitlin arrives with the pizza, but Ross screws up the flirting again, ending up talking to her about gas and methane. He scares her so much that she pays for the pizza herself and flees the apartment. Out of pity for Ross, Rachel catches up with Caitlin and tries to talk her into going out with Ross. Rachel returns to the apartment and gives Ross Caitlin's phone number.

Meanwhile, Joey introduces everyone to his Italian grandmother, who is deeply intent on seeing her grandson debut on Law & Order. As she does not speak a word of English, they find it difficult to communicate with her, except for Phoebe, who manages to offer her a glass of water in Italian. The TV show starts, but Joey finds out that he has been cut out of it. Desperate not to shock his grandmother, he records a crude clip of himself on tape at his apartment in a crime scene where he holds his duck hostage. But the clip is good enough for Nonni – until the tape continues rolling, showing Chandler sing "Space Oddity" in front of the camera.

Monica, getting dressed for the big anniversary date, asks Phoebe to return the earrings that Chandler bought her, which Phoebe borrowed some time ago. It turns out, however, that Phoebe lent the same earrings to Rachel, who has lost one of them. Phoebe tells her how the earrings are Monica's, which makes Rachel flip out because she is not allowed to borrow Monica's stuff as she ends up losing it. Fearing that Monica will kill her if she finds out, Phoebe takes the blame instead of Rachel, but Monica is understanding with her. Rachel steps in and explains everything to Monica, who immediately loses it with Rachel. Monica ends up wearing another pair of earrings, which luckily for her, Chandler doesn't notice. Monica and Chandler leave for dinner, and Chandler thanks Ross for the earrings he picked up for Monica.

Production
"The One Where Ross Can't Flirt" was written by Doty Abrams, her first writing credit of the season. The episode was directed by Gail Mancuso. Kristin Dattilo and Lilyan Chauvin guest-starred as Caitlin, the pizza delivery girl and Joey's grandmother respectively.

Cultural references
The Law & Order episode being watched by the friends is clearly "Agony". During breaks in the friends' dialogue, the TV is audible, including Jack McCoy mentioning the name of the suspect (Bergstrom) and Abbie Carmichael discussing her links to the Houston D.A.'s office. The times during which the TV is visible also confirm that "Agony" is playing.

Reception
In its original American broadcast, "The One Where Ross Can't Flirt" finished first in ratings for the week of April 19–25, 1999, with a Nielsen rating of 14.4. It was the highest rated show on the NBC network that week. In the United Kingdom the episode premiered on Sky1 on May 13, 1999 and was watched by 1.73 million viewers, making the program the most watched on the channel that week.

References

External links

1999 American television episodes
Friends (season 5) episodes